Martin of Braga (in Latin Martinus Bracarensis, in Portuguese, known as Martinho de Dume  520–580 AD) was an archbishop of Bracara Augusta in Gallaecia (now Braga in Portugal), a missionary, a monastic founder, and an ecclesiastical author. According to his contemporary, the historian Gregory of Tours, Martin was plenus virtutibus ("full of virtue") and in tantum se litteris imbuit ut nulli secundus sui temporis haberetur ("he so instructed himself in learning that he was considered second to none in his lifetime"). He was later canonized in the Catholic Church as well as in the Eastern and Oriental Orthodox churches, for his work in converting the inhabitants of Gallaecia to Chalcedonian Christianity. His feast day is 20 March.

Life
Born in Pannonia, in Central Europe, Martin made a pilgrimage to the Holy Land, where he became a monk. He found his way to Hispania, decided to settle in Gallaecia. "His intentions in going to a place so remote by the standards of his own day are unknown," writes Roger Collins. But his arrival in Gallaecia was historically significant, for he played an important role in converting the Suevi from their current Arian beliefs to the Chalcedonian Christianity of their Fifth-century king Rechiar. While there he founded several monasteries, the best known of which was at Dumium; around 550 he was consecrated bishop of Braga, whence comes his surname.

In May 561, Martin attended the provincial First Council of Braga as bishop of Dumio. He presided over the Second Council of Braga held in 572 as archbishop of Braga, having been elevated to the archdiocese between the two events; Laistner notes "His authorship of ten chapters submitted and approved in 572 is certain and there is little doubt that he also compiled the Acts of both Councils."

Works
Martin of Braga was a prolific author. Besides his contributions to the two provincial councils, he translated into Latin a collection of 109 sayings attributed to Egyptian abbots, while at his instigation the monk Paschasius, whom Martin had taught Greek translated another collection of sayings, entitled Verbum seniorum. But for modern scholars, his most interesting works were two treatises he wrote in the final decade of his life, De ira and Formula vitae honestae, because they were adapted from two essays of Seneca the Younger which were subsequently lost. "Martin's tract are valuable evidence that some at least of Seneca's writings were still available in the land of his birth in the sixth century," writes Laistner. Three other short essays on ethics demonstrate his clear familiarity with the works of John Cassian.

Another important work is his sermon, written in the form of a letter to his fellow bishop Polemius of Asturica, De correctione rusticorum, which discusses the issue of rural paganism. Noting that this sermon has often been seen as evidence of Martin's missionary work against rural paganism, Collins asserts that a closer look does not support this thesis, for "there are no points of contact [in this work] with what is known of the indigenous pre-Christian cults of rural Galicia." The influences present in this work have been debated: Laistner sees evidence of the sermons of the Gallic bishop Caesarius of Arles, who lived a generation ago; Collins believes it is modelled on a treatise of Augustine of Hippo on the same topic.

Martin also composed poetry; Gregory of Tours notes that he authored the verses over the southern portal of the church of Saint Martins of Tours in that city.

Moral treatises
 Formula vitae honestae, or De differentiis quatuor virtutumvitae honestae (Rules for an Honest Life, or On the Four Cardinal Virtues): addressed to Miro, king of the Sueves. From its similarities to other works of Seneca the Younger modern scholars believe that Martin adapted his work from a lost writing of Seneca. In the twelfth century, an accident caused the loss of the preface attributing the work to Martin, causing scribes and readers mistakenly to identify the treatise as a genuine work by Seneca. As such, over the next three centuries, Formula vitae honestae was used alongside the Epistle to Seneca the Younger as proof for Seneca's adherence to Christianity.
 (572) De ira (On Anger): also adapted from a work of Seneca.
 Three linked treatises: the two vices, Vanity and Pride, are taken from a list of eight set out by John Cassian.
 Pro repellenda jactantia (Driving Away Vanity)
 De superbia (On Pride)
 Exhortatio humilitatis (Exhortation to Humility)

Councils and canons
 (561) First Council of Braga
 (572) Second Council of Braga
 (572) Canons of St. Martin: appended to the text of the Second Council. These a collection of eighty-four canons translated by Martin from the (Greek and Egyptian) canons of the Eastern church.
 (570?) De Pascha (On Easter): part of the Canons of St. Martin and the Second Council of Braga De Pascha is Martin's explanation on how to calculate the date of Easter. According to Martin, Easter may be observed no earlier than March 22, and no later than April 21, and the date may be announced during Advent so the people may know when Lent begins.

Other works and treatises
  De correctione rusticorum (On the Reform of Rustics)
 De trina mersione (On Triple Immersion): addressed to Bishop Boniface, of whom little is known other than that he resided in sixth century Visigothic Iberia. In his letter, Martin denounces the Arian practice of performing baptism in the three names of the Trinity. Martin insists the correct practice is to perform triple immersion in the  Trinity's single name.
 Sententiae Patrum Aegyptiorum (Saying of the Egyptian Fathers): translated by Martin from an anonymous Greek manuscript he carried with him to Iberia. Two translations exist: one by the monk Paschasius, who was instructed in Greek by Martin, and one by Martin himself. The version by Martin is twenty-two sections shorter than Paschasius's, as most of the anecdotes about the daily life of the Egyptian ascetic monks were removed to focus on their moral instruction. 
 Poetry: only three poems by Martin are preserved from history. Two of them are inscriptions for buildings, and the third is a six-line epitaph about Martin's own life.

De correctione rusticorum

In 572, the Second Council of Braga decreed that bishops are to call the people of their church together, so they may be converted to Christianity. After the council, a bishop named Polemius of Astorga wrote to Martin of Braga asking for advice on the conversion of rural pagans. Polemius was especially concerned about their perceived idolatry and sin. Martin's reply was a treatise in the form of a sermon, enclosed in his responding letter to Polemius.

Out of all of Martin's works, De correctione rusticorum (On the Reform of Rustics) is of particular interest to modern scholars. It contains both a detailed catalogue of sixth-century Iberian pagan practices, and an unusually tolerant approach to them by Martin. Alberto Ferreiro attributes Martin's acceptance to his classical education in the East, as well as the influence of philosophers like Seneca and Plato.<ref>Ferreiro, A. (1995). "Braga and tours: Some Observations on Gregory's "De virtutibus sancti martini" (1.11). Journal of Early Christian Studies, 3, 195. Retrieved March 5, 2015</ref> Martin himself had avoided religious suppression by traveling to Dumium, in what is now Portugal . He had sailed east around 550, during the period when Justinian I was attempting to reunite the Later Roman Empire through consolidation of the empire's faith. In 529, Justinian had placed the Neoplatonic Academy under state control, effectively signifying the end of pagan philosophical teaching. Later, in 553, Origen was also anathematized, effectively crushing Origenism. The Codex Justinianus enforced Nicaean Christianity over all other rival doctrines. Martin may have chosen to flee east to avoid Rome's anti-intellectual policies, which possible explains his relatively gentle approach to the Suevi in Gallaecia.

Although Martin's training as a monk was based on the ascetic Desert Fathers of the Egyptian desert, he lessened their severe monastic regulations to aid the Iberians to adapt. When converting the Suevi, he avoided enforcing Catholicism, preferring persuasion over coercion. He also wrote his sermon in a deliberately rustic style, incorporating ungrammatical Latin constructions and local vulgarisms.

In his instructions, Martin objects to the astrological custom of naming the days of the week after gods (planets). Due to his influence Portuguese and Galician (which, at the time, were one single language), alone among the Romance languages, assumed names for the days from numbers and Catholic liturgy, rather than from pagan deities. Galician has largely returned to the earlier nomenclature.

Notes

Sources

 Further reading 
 Torre, Chara (ed., trans., comm.). Martini Bracarensis De ira: introduzione, testo, traduzione e commento'' (Roma: Herder, 2008). (Studi e testi tardoantichi, 7).

520 births
Bishops of Braga
580 deaths
6th-century bishops in the Visigothic Kingdom
6th-century Christian saints
6th-century Latin writers
Converts to Catholicism from Arianism
Greek–Latin translators
6th-century translators
Portuguese saints